Salopochitina is an extinct genus of chitinozoans. It was described by Swire in 1990. It contains a single species, Salopochitina filifera.

References

Prehistoric marine animals
Fossil taxa described in 1990